Moombria is a former rural locality in the Barcaldine Region, Queensland, Australia.

On 22 November 2019, the Queensland Government decided to amalgamate the localities in the Barcaldine Region, resulting in five expanded localities based on the larger towns: Alpha, Aramac, Barcaldine, Jericho and Muttaburra. Moombria was incorporated into Barcaldine.

Geography 
The Barcoo River forms the southern boundary of the locality while the Alice River forms the western boundary. Their confluence is at the south-western boundary of the locality.

The principal land use is grazing on native vegetation.

Education 
There are no schools in Moombria. The nearest primary and secondary schools are in Blackall.

References 

Barcaldine Region
Unbounded localities in Queensland